Lancaster and Fleetwood is a constituency created in 2010 represented in the House of Commons of the UK Parliament by Cat Smith of the Labour Party.

History
Creation
Following their review of parliamentary representation in Lancashire, the Boundary Commission created a new Wyre and Preston North constituency, contested first at the 2010 general election, which split the previous linking of Lancaster and Wyre. As a consequence, Lancaster and the coastal town of Fleetwood have been attached for parliamentary purposes.

Summary of results to date
In 2010 the winning candidate was Eric Ollerenshaw, a Conservative. He lost in the 2015 general election to Labour's Cat Smith. The 2015 result gave the seat the 16th-smallest majority of Labour's 232 seats by percentage of majority. Ollerenshaw attempted to regain the seat at the 2017 general election but Smith won again, significantly increasing her majority to over 6,500. At the 2019 general election, Smith's majority declined to 2,380.

Boundaries

The new seat of Lancaster and Fleetwood was subject to public consultation following the decision to create a new seat in Lancashire in the run-up to the 2010 United Kingdom general election, which caused major consequential changes to the central and southern parts of the county. During the consultation process, the Wyre ward of Cabus was moved from Lancaster and Fleetwood to Wyre and Preston North.

The seat has electoral wards:

Bulk, Castle, Duke's, Ellel, John O'Gaunt, Lower Lune Valley, Marsh, Scotforth East, Scotforth West and University in the City of Lancaster
Mount, Park, Pharos, Pilling, Preesall, Rossall, Warren and Wyresdale in the borough of Wyre

Members of Parliament

Elections

Elections in the 2010s

See also
 List of parliamentary constituencies in Lancashire
 Opinion polling for the next United Kingdom general election in individual constituencies

Notes

References

Parliamentary constituencies in North West England
Politics of Lancashire
Politics of Lancaster
Politics of Wyre
Constituencies of the Parliament of the United Kingdom established in 2010